Jiří Bobok (born 1 March 1977) is a goalkeeper  from Czech Republic who played in the Gambrinus Liga for SFC Opava and FK Jablonec 97. He also spent time with clubs including AC Sparta Prague, FK Chmel Blšany, SK Spolana Neratovice.

References

External links

1977 births
Living people
Czech footballers
Czech expatriate footballers
AC Sparta Prague players
FK Jablonec players
SFC Opava players
AEK Larnaca FC players
Czech First League players
Cypriot First Division players
Expatriate footballers in Cyprus
Association football goalkeepers
Footballers from Prague